USS LSM-217 was a  built for the United States Navy during World War II. Like many of her class, she was not named and is properly referred to by her hull designation.

She was laid down (Unknown) at Dravo Corporation, Wilmington, DE., launched on (Unknown), and commissioned as USS LSM-217 on 4 Aug 1944.

Service history
LSM-217 was assigned to the Asiatic-Pacific Theater and crossed the International Date Line on 7 November 1944. As part of the Invasion of Lingayen Gulf she participated in the Luzon operation, which included the Lingayen Gulf landings (4-12 January 1945).

LSM-217 was struck from the Naval Register in 1946.

Final Disposition, sold, 22 October 1947, to Avondale Marine Ways, Inc., Westwego, LA., fate unknown.

LSM-217 earned one battle stars for World War II service

See also
 Landing Ship Medium
 World War II
 Landing craft
 Battle of Leyte

External links
 

World War II amphibious warfare vessels of the United States
1944 ships
LSM-1-class landing ships medium
Ships built by Dravo Corporation
Ships built in Wilmington, Delaware